Pelota vasca may refer to:
Basque pelota — court ballgame similar to jai alai
La pelota vasca — 2003 political documentary about the Basque County, by Julio Medem